Qāsim ibn Hāshim ibn Fulaytah al-Ḥasanī al-‘Alawī (d. 1162) was Emir of Mecca from 1155 to 1161, and briefly in 1162. He belonged to the sharifian dynasty known as the Hawashim. He was preceded by his father Hashim, and succeeded by his uncle Isa ibn Fulaytah.

Sources 

Sharifs of Mecca
1162 deaths
Year of birth unknown
12th-century Arabs